At the 1970 FIFA World Cup, Israel participated for the first time. Israel qualified for the FIFA World Cup for the first time in 1970, along with El Salvador and Morocco.

Although it was reported in the build-up to the final draw that seedings would be used, as had been the case at the previous two World Cup Finals, the FIFA Organising Committee ultimately announced that there would be no seeding of teams. Instead the sixteen teams were divided into four 'geographical groupings', which also took into account the teams' strengths and even political considerations; the system ensured that Israel and Morocco would not be drawn to face each other, after Morocco had earlier threatened to withdraw from the tournament, as they had done from the Olympic football tournament two years earlier, if that were the case.

1970 Qualifying Round

1970 Qualifying Round 1
During the 1970 FIFA World Cup qualification Israel received a First Round bye in the first round and moved directly to the second round.

1970 Qualifying Round 2
In the second round, North Korea, quarter-finalists at the previous tournament, were disqualified after refusing to play in Israel for political reasons.

1970 Qualifying Final Round

|}

1970 FIFA World Cup Group 2

Uruguay vs Israel

Sweden vs Israel

Italy vs Israel

Squad
Head coach: Emmanuel Scheffer

References 

 
Israel national football team
1969–70 in Israeli football